Ali Akbar Entezami (1943 -  18 July 2015) was an Iranian chemist and professor at the University of Tabriz. He received a PhD in Polymer Chemistry from Louis Pasteur University.

Life
Entezami was born 1943 in Khoy, West Azerbaijan, Iran. He died  18 July 2015 in Tabriz. Mohammad-Reza Pour-Mohammadi, President of Tabriz University, Hamid Mirzadeh, President of Islamic Azad University, and Esmaeil Jabbarzadeh, Governor of East Azerbaijan said condolences for his death.

References

External links 
 Ali Akbar Entezami in University of Tabriz 
 Ali Akbar Entezami in Iran Polymer and Petrochemical Institute
 Polymer International by Bakhshali Massoumi, Parivash Jafarpour1, Mehdi Jaymand and Ali Akbar Entezami
 Journal of Applied Polymer Science by Mohammad Reza Nabid and Ali Akbar Entezami
 Iranian Polymer Journal by Massoumeh Bagheri, Zhaleh Pourmoazzen and Ali Akbar Entezami
 Ali Akbar Entezami in iranpolymer

1943 births
2015 deaths
People from Khoy
Academic staff of the University of Tabriz
University of Strasbourg alumni
University of Tabriz alumni
Iranian chemists